This is a '''list of universities in Guinea.

Universities in Guinea 
 Université Kofi Annan de Guinee
 Université Utad-Guinée
 Université Mercure Internationale
 Université Général Lansana Conté de Sonfonia

See also 
 Education in Guinea

References 

Education in Guinea
Guinea
Universities
Guinea
Universities